Conguaco is a municipality in the Jutiapa department of Guatemala.

References

Municipalities of the Jutiapa Department